is a Japanese football player.

Club statistics
Updated to 14 February 2017.

References

External links

Fukushima United FC

1988 births
Living people
Waseda University alumni
Association football people from Nagasaki Prefecture
Japanese footballers
J2 League players
J3 League players
Japan Football League players
FC Gifu players
Fukushima United FC players
Association football fullbacks